The year 2000 was the 29th year after the independence of Bangladesh. It was also the fifth year of the first term of the Government of Sheikh Hasina.

Incumbents

 President: Shahabuddin Ahmed
 Prime Minister: Sheikh Hasina
 Chief Justice: Latifur Rahman (starting 1 January)

Demography

Climate

Flood
In September 2000, at least 50,000 people are marooned in Bangladesh after flood water gushed into 30 villages when India opened sluice gates of several rivers.

Economy

Note: For the year 2000 average official exchange rate for BDT was 52.14 per US$.

Events

 20 March – President Bill Clinton becomes the first president of America to visit Bangladesh.
 14 April - Ekushey Television, Bangladesh's first privately owned terrestrial television network, begins transmissions.
 12 July - Bangladesh and India border guards exchange fire over death of civilians.
 26 July - Bangladesh announces closure of academic institutions over Dengue epidemic.
 2 August – The International Cricket Council voted to make Bangladesh the 10th test-playing nation.
 3 September - Bangladesh repeals Vested Property Act.
 10 November – The Bangladesh national cricket team make their test debut (see Sports below).
 25 November - 40 people die, 100 injured in Bangladesh factory fir.
 15 December – A Pakistani diplomat was expelled from Bangladesh on account of his remark about Bangladesh Liberation War.
 29 December - A ferry capsizes in the Meghna river leading to 144 deaths.

Awards and recognitions

Independence Day Award

Ekushey Padak
 Ekhlas Uddin Ahmed, literature
 Mohiuddin Ahmed, politics (posthumous)
 Rafiq Uddin Ahmed, language martyr
 Abul Barkat, language martyr
 Syed Abdul Hadi, music
 Gaziul Haque, Language Movement
 Khalid Hossain, music
 Nilima Ibrahim, education
 Jamal Nazrul Islam, science and technology
 Abdul Jabbar, language martyr
 Abdullah Al Mamun, drama
 Zahidur Rahim, music (posthumous)
 Sofiur Rahman, language martyr
 Abdus Salam, language martyr
 Shamim Sikder, sculpture

Sports
 Olympics:
 Bangladesh sent a delegation to compete in the 2000 Summer Olympics in Sydney, Australia. Bangladesh did not win any medals in the competition.
 Domestic football:
 National Championship was organized for the first time in 2000. Abahani KC won the championship title while Mohammedan SC came out runner-up.
 Abahani KC won Bangladesh Federation Cup.
 Cricket:
 In January 2000, Marylebone Cricket Club (MCC) toured Bangladesh to play five matches including one first-class against the national team. The first class match was drawn.
 The 2000 Asia Cup was held in Bangladesh between May–June 2000. India, Pakistan, Sri Lanka and Bangladesh took part in the tournament. Pakistan won the tournament beating Sri Lanka by 39 runs in the final.
 India's national team visited Bangladesh in November to take part in the inaugural Test match played by the Bangladesh national cricket team. The tour consisted of a one-off test match. India won the match by 9 wickets. Bangladesh's Aminul Islam became the third batsman to make a century in their country's inaugural Test.

Births
 2 March – Nahida Akter, cricketer
 20 August – Puja Cherry Roy, film actor

Deaths
 15 February – Shamsul Huda Chaudhury, politician (b. 1920)
 3 March – Barin Mazumder, musician (b. 1921)
 1 April – AKM Abdur Rouf, founder-curator of BFA (b. 1935)
 22 June – Manoranjan Dhar, politician (b. 1904)
 28 July – Rokeya Rahman Kabeer, academic (b. 1925)
 4 December – Shyam Sundar Baishnab, singer
 20 December – Mirza Ghulam Hafiz, politician (b. 1920)

See also 
 2000s in Bangladesh
 List of Bangladeshi films of 2000
 Timeline of Bangladeshi history

References

 
Bangladesh
Bangladesh